Niek te Veluwe (born 21 December 1993) is a Dutch professional footballer who currently plays for AZSV. Te Veluwe made his debut in professional football for De Graafschap in the match versus FC Den Bosch. He replaced Tim Vincken in the second half. He played for the same amateur club as the likes of Siem de Jong and Luuk de Jong, DZC '68. Former teammate Caner Cavlan also played for DZC '68.

External links
 Voetbal International

1993 births
Living people
Dutch footballers
De Graafschap players
Eerste Divisie players
People from Doetinchem
Footballers from Gelderland
DZC '68 players
Association football defenders